The 1964 Cork Senior Hurling Championship was the 76th staging of the Cork Senior Hurling Championship since its establishment by the Cork County Board in 1887. The draw for the opening fixtures took place at the Cork Convention on 26 January 1964. The championship began on 19 April 1964 and ended on 11 October 1964.

University College Cork were the defending champions, however, they were defeated by St. Finbarr's at the quarter-final stage.

On 11 October 1964, Glen Rovers won the championship following a 3-12 to 2-7 defeat of St. Finbarr's in the final. This was their 20th championship title overall and their first in two championship seasons.

Patsy Harte of the Glen Rovers club was the championship's top scorer with 3-17.

Team changes

To Championship

Promoted from the Cork Intermediate Hurling Championship
 Cobh

From Championship

Regraded to the Cork Intermediate Hurling Championship
 Midleton

Results

First round

Quarter-finals

Semi-finals

Final

Championship statistics

Top scorers

Top scorer overall

Top scorers in a single game

Miscellaneous

 Christy Ring won his final title on the field of play.

References

Cork Senior Hurling Championship
Cork Senior Hurling Championship